Aponotoreas synclinalis (also known as the Wirerush looper) is a moth of the family Geometridae. It is endemic to New Zealand.

Taxonomy
This species was first described by George Vernon Hudson in 1903 as Notoreas synclinalis from a type specimen discovered by Alfred Philpott at Seaward Moss near Invercargill on 4 January 1900. In 1986 R. C. Craw described the new genus Aponotoreas and included A. synclinalis within it.

Distribution
This moth is common in upland areas of the Catlins, Longwood Range and Stewart Island. It is also present in south-west Fiordland. It is unusual as it is only one of two species in its genus where specimens have been collected at sea level.

Behaviour 
This species is day flying and is on the wing from January until March.

Host plants
The host plant of the larvae of A. synclinalis is Empodisma minus, the lesser wire rush, and in alpine areas of Stewart Island is Dracophyllum politum.

References

External links

 Citizen science observations of species
 Specimens held at the Auckland War Memorial Museum

Moths of New Zealand
Hydriomenini
Moths described in 1903
Endemic fauna of New Zealand
Endemic moths of New Zealand